Matthew Thomas Renshaw (born 28 March 1996) is an Australian international cricketer. He played eleven Tests for Australia between 2016 and 2018 as an opening batsman, and was recalled to the Test team in 2023. In domestic first-class cricket he plays for Queensland, and in the Big Bash League he has played for the Brisbane Heat and Adelaide Strikers.

Early life and domestic career
Matt Renshaw was born in Middlesbrough, England. His family moved to New Zealand when he was seven, and then to Australia when he was ten. He attended Brisbane Grammar School.

He scored his maiden first-class century on 6 December 2015 in the 2015–16 Sheffield Shield against New South Wales. He made his List A debut for the National Performance Squad against India A on 27 August 2016.

In March 2018, Cricket Australia named Renshaw in their Sheffield Shield team of the year after making 686 runs. In December 2018, he made a record score for Brisbane senior cricket: 345 for Toombul off 273 balls, with 38 fours and 12 sixes.

Ahead of the 2019–20 Marsh One-Day Cup, Renshaw was named as one of the six cricketers to watch during the tournament.

From 2018 to 2019, he played for Brisbane Heat in Big Bash League before moving to Adelaide Strikers for the 2020–21 Big Bash League season. He also signed a three-year contract with the Adelaide Strikers in September 2020. After two seasons with Adelaide, he returned to the Brisbane Heat for the 2022–23 Big Bash League season.

English county cricket
Following the ball-tampering incident in South Africa, and the subsequent nine-month ban for Renshaw's international teammate Cameron Bancroft, Renshaw was signed to replace Bancroft as an international player at Somerset County Cricket Club for the 2018 English cricket season. He made his debut for Somerset on 20 April 2018 against Worcestershire, scoring 101 not out, exactly half of Somerset's first innings total of 202, and went on to score 513 runs at an average of 51.13 in six Championship matches for the county, scoring another century in his second match. He also scored 180 runs in six List A appearances for Somerset before his spell at the county was cut short following a broken finger.

In February 2019, Renshaw agreed to play for Kent County Cricket Club for the early stages of the season leading up to the 2019 Ashes series. Playing for Kent in a one-day match against Sussex on 21 April 2019 Renshaw top-scored with 109 off 111 balls In January 2022, Renshaw re-signed for Somerset ahead of the 2022 domestic season in England.

International career

In November 2016 he was added to Australia's Test squad ahead of the third Test against South Africa. He made his Test debut on 24 November 2016 as an opening batsman, replacing his opening partner in Queensland, Joe Burns. His baggy green cap was presented by Ian Healy.

Renshaw scored his first Test century, 184, against Pakistan at the Sydney Cricket Ground in his fourth match. He became the 133rd Test centurion for Australia.

Renshaw became the first Australian cricketer to score 500 Test runs before turning 21 years of age and has scored the most number of Test runs before turning 21 years for Australia, with 524.

Renshaw played ten tests in 2016 and 2017, but had poor form in the tours of India and Bangladesh in 2017, and lost his place in the test team to Cameron Bancroft.

Following the 2018 Australian ball-tampering scandal and the suspension of Bancroft, David Warner and captain Steve Smith, Renshaw was recalled to the team for the fourth and final Test of the 2018 test series against South Africa. 

In April 2018, following the South African series, he was awarded a national contract by Cricket Australia for the 2018–19 season, and was in the Test squad for the tour of the UAE against Pakistan. However Renshaw suffered an injury in a warm-up game, and did not play in the Test series against Pakistan. He then had poor form the following summer and could not break back into the Test team. In April 2019, it was announced that Renshaw had not been offered a central Cricket Australia contract for the 2019–20 season.

In March 2022, Renshaw was added to Australia's One Day International (ODI) squad for their series against Pakistan, but did not play a game.

After being out of the Test team for more than four years, Renshaw was recalled in January 2023, in the final Test of the 2022–23 series against South Africa, batting in the middle order to replace the injured Cameron Green. He kept his place in the team in the first Test of the Australian tour of India in February–March 2023. He was initially dropped for the second Test, but played in the second innings as a concussion substitute, before being dropped again for the third Test.

References

External links
 

1996 births
Living people
People from Middlesbrough
English emigrants to New Zealand
English emigrants to Australia
Australian cricketers
Australia Test cricketers
Queensland cricketers
Somerset cricketers
Brisbane Heat cricketers
Kent cricketers
People educated at Brisbane Grammar School
Adelaide Strikers cricketers